The Twenty-Second Legislature of the Territory of Hawaii was a session of the Hawaii Territorial Legislature.  The session convened in Honolulu, Hawaii, and ran from February 7 until April 28, 1943.  It was the only legislative session convened while Hawaii was under martial law during World War II.

Legislative session
The session ran from February 7 until April 28, 1943. It passed 230 bills into law.

Senators

House of Representatives

References

Notes

Hawaii legislative sessions
1943 in Hawaii